Baccharis hambatensis is a species of flowering plant in the family Asteraceae that is endemic to Ecuador. Its natural habitats are subtropical or tropical moist montane forests and subtropical or tropical high-altitude shrubland. It is threatened by habitat loss.

References

hambatensis
Endemic flora of Ecuador
Vulnerable flora of South America
Taxonomy articles created by Polbot